Jugorje is a settlement east of Gabrje in the Gorjanci Hills in the City Municipality of Novo Mesto in southeastern Slovenia. The area is part of the traditional region of Lower Carniola and is now included in the Southeast Slovenia Statistical Region.

References

External links
Jugorje on Geopedia

Populated places in the City Municipality of Novo Mesto